Joseph Leon Blau (May 6, 1909 – December 28, 1986) was an American scholar of Jewish history and philosophy.

Biography
Blau was born in Brooklyn, New York. He attended Columbia University, where he studied under Salo Wittmayer Baron.  He earned his bachelor's degree in 1931, his master's in 1933, and his Ph.D. in 1944, all from Columbia.  Blau taught at Columbia from 1944 to 1977 and was chair of its Department of Religion from 1968 to 1977.

Blau was one of the signers of A Secular Humanist Declaration in 1980.  He was also one of the signers of the Humanist Manifesto. He was a foreign member of the British Academy.

He died in 1986 in Riverdale, New York.

Writings
His notable writings include Christian Interpretation of the Cabala in the Renaissance (1944); Men and Movements in American Philosophy (1952); The Story of Jewish Philosophy (1962), The Jews of the United States, 1790–1840 (co-edited with Salo Baron, 1963), and Judaism in America (1976).

References

External links
Finding Aid to the Joseph L. Blau papers, Columbia University
 Columbia Encyclopedia entry

1909 births
1986 deaths
American philosophy academics
American religion academics
20th-century American Jews
Columbia College (New York) alumni
Columbia University faculty
Judaic studies
Jewish philosophers